George W. Bush is a 2020 two-part biographical television film about former United States President George W. Bush. Produced by PBS for the American Experience documentary program, it recounts Bush's life from his childhood up to the end of his two-term presidency in 2008. Directed by Jamila Ephron and written by Barak Goodman and Chris Durrance, the film aired on PBS in two parts on May 4 and 5, 2020.

Interviewees

Peter Baker
Dan Bartlett
Joshua Bolten
Elisabeth Bumiller
Andy Card
Richard Clarke
Ari Fleischer
David Frum
Barton Gellman
Clay Johnson
Bill Minutaglio
Michael Morell
Gen. David Petraeus
George Packer
Martha Raddatz
Eugene Robinson
Karl Rove
Wayne Slater
Ron Suskind
Col. Lawrence Wilkerson
Lawrence Wright
Robin Wright

Production
On July 29, 2019, PBS announced that American Experience will produce a two-part biographical film about former President George W. Bush to be released in Spring 2020. The film was then titled W, with Barak Goodman as writer, producer, and director; Goodman previously wrote and directed the 2012 film on Bill Clinton. By January 2020, Jamila Ephron was revealed to have since become part of the project.

On April 14, 2020, PBS revealed that the film will premiere the next month on May 4 and 5. In regard to the inclusion of Ari Fleischer and Andrew Card, both of whom have been documented to give lies during the Bush administration, Goodman explained that "I think that what this administration, with some exceptions, underwent was a process of self-delusion. Not that they set out to lie to the American people, they lied to themselves", adding that "[t]he fact is, these were the guys who were there."

Critical response
Brian Lowry of CNN gave George W. Bush a negative review, criticizing its omission of some significant details in Bush's life and presidency such as the controversy toward his National Guard service and Karl Rove's alleged "smear tactics" during the 2000 primary of the Republican Party, in addition to the film's decision not to cover his post-presidency. Lowry added that the film is also unsuccessful in adding further insight into Bush's character other than what is already known about him. Scott D. Pierce of The Salt Lake Tribune on the other hand assessed the film to be "worth watching" for its direct and fair documentation of Bush's life.

References

External links
PBS official site

2020 television films
2020 documentary films
American Experience
American television films
Documentary films about presidents of the United States
Documentary films about war
Films about George W. Bush
2020 films
2020s English-language films
2020s American films